Paradise Now is a political and psychological drama film directed by Hany Abu-Assad about two Palestinian men preparing for a suicide attack in Israel. It won the Golden Globe Award for Best Foreign Language Film and was nominated for an Academy Award in the same category.

"The film is an artistic point of view of that political issue," Abu-Assad said. "The politicians want to see it as black and white, good and evil, and art wants to see it as a human thing".

Plot
Paradise Now follows Palestinian childhood friends Said and Khaled who live in Nablus and have been recruited for suicide attacks in Tel Aviv. It focuses on what would be their last days together.

Their handlers from an unidentified resistance group tell them the attack will take place the next day. The pair record videos glorifying God and their cause, and bid their unknowing families and loved ones goodbye, while trying to behave normally to avoid arousing suspicion. The next day, they shave off their hair and beards and don suits in order to look like Israelis. Their cover story is that they are going to a wedding.

An explosive belt is attached to each man; the handlers are the only ones with the keys needed to remove the belts without detonating them. The men are instructed to detonate the bombs at the same place, a military check point in Israel, with a time interval of 15 minutes so that the second bomb will kill police arriving after the first blast.

They cross the Israeli border, but have to flee from guards. Khaled returns to their handlers, who have fled by the time Said arrives. The handlers remove Khaled's explosive belt and issue a search for Said. Khaled believes he is the best person to find Said since he knows him well, and he is given until the end of that day to find him.

After Said escapes from the guards, he approaches an Israeli settlement. At one point, he considers detonating the bomb on a commercial bus, but he decides not to when he sees a child on board. Eventually, Said reveals his reason for taking part in the suicide bombing. While in a car with Suha, a woman he has fallen in love with, he explains that his father was an ameel (a "collaborator", or Palestinian working for the Israelis), who was executed for his actions.  He blames the Israelis for taking advantage of his father's weakness.

Khaled eventually finds Said, who is still wearing the belt and about to detonate it while lying on his father's grave. They return to the handlers, and Said convinces them that the attack need not be canceled, because he is ready for it.  They both travel to Tel Aviv. Influenced by Suha, who discovered their plan, Khaled cancels his suicide attack. Khaled tries to convince Said to back off as well. However, Said manages to shake Khaled by pretending to agree.

The film ends with a long shot of Said sitting on a bus carrying Israeli soldiers, slowly zooming in on his eyes, and then suddenly cuts to white.

Production
Hany Abu-Assad and co-writer Bero Beyer started working on the script in 1999, but it took them five years to get the story before cameras. The original script was about one man searching for his friend, who is a suicide bomber, but it evolved into a story of two friends, Said and Khaled.

The filmmakers faced great difficulties making the film on location. A land mine exploded 300 meters away from the set. While filming in Nablus, Israeli helicopter gunships launched a missile attack on a car near the film's set one day, prompting six crew members to abandon the production indefinitely. Paradise Now'''s location manager was kidnapped by a Palestinian faction during the shoot and was not released until Palestinian President Yasser Arafat's office intervened. In an interview with the Telegraph, Hany Abu-Assad said, "If I could go back in time, I wouldn't do it again. It's not worth endangering your life for a movie." The Israel Film Fund is underwriting the film’s distribution in Israel.

Statements by the filmmakers
In Hany Abu-Assad's Golden Globe acceptance speech he made a plea for a Palestinian state, saying he hoped the Golden Globe was “a recognition that the Palestinians deserve their liberty and equality unconditionally."

In an interview with Jewish American Tikkun magazine, Hany Abu-Assad was asked "When you look ahead now, what gives you hope?", "The conscience of the Jewish people" he answered. "The Jews have been the conscience of humanity, always, wherever they go. Not all Jews, but part of them. Ethics. Morality. They invented it! I think Hitler wanted to kill the conscience of the Jews, the conscience of humanity. But this conscience is still alive...Maybe a bit weak...But still alive. Thank God." He has also stated in an interview to Tel Aviv-based newspaper Yedioth Ahronoth that had he been raised in the Palestinian territories instead of in his Arab-Israeli home city of Nazareth, he would have become a suicide bomber himself.

Israeli-Jewish producer Amir Harel  told reporters that "First and foremost the movie is a good work of art", adding that "If the movie raises awareness or presents a different side of reality, this is an important thing."

Oscar controversyParadise Now was the first Palestinian film to be nominated for the Academy Award for Best Foreign Language Film. An earlier Palestinian film, Divine Intervention (2002), had controversially failed to gain admission to the competition, allegedly because films nominated for this award must be put forward by the government of their country, and Palestine's status as a sovereign state is disputed. However, since entities such as Puerto Rico, Hong Kong and Taiwan have been submitting entries for years although they are not sovereign states with full United Nations representation, accusations of a double standard were made.Paradise Now was submitted to the Academy and to the Golden Globes as a film from 'Palestine'. It was referred to as such at the Golden Globes. However, Israeli officials, including Consul General Ehud Danoch and Consul for Media and Public Affairs Gilad Millo, tried to extract a guarantee from the Academy of Motion Picture Arts and Sciences that Paradise Now would not be presented in the ceremony as representing the state of Palestine, despite the fact it was introduced as such in the Academy Awards' official website. The Academy Awards began to refer to the film's country instead as "the Palestinian Authority". This decision angered director-writer Hany Abu-Assad, who said it represented a slap in the face for the Palestinian people and their national identity. The Academy subsequently referred to it as a submission from the "Palestinian Territories".

On March 1, 2006, a group representing Israeli victims of suicide bombings asked the Oscar organizers to disqualify the film. These protesters claimed that showing the film was immoral and encouraged killing civilians in terror acts.

Reception

Critical responseParadise Now has an 89% rating on the review compendium website Rotten Tomatoes, based on 103 reviews, and an average rating of 7.48/10. The site's consensus states: "This film delves deeply into the minds of suicide bombers, and the result is unsettling ." Metacritic assigned the film a weighted average score of 71 out of 100, based on 32 critics, indicating "generally favorable reviews".

Stephen Holden, in his October 28, 2005 article in the New York Times, applauded the suspense and plot twists in the movie, and the risks involved in humanizing suicide bombers, saying "it is easier to see a suicide bomber as a 21st-century Manchurian Candidate - a soulless, robotic shell of a person programmed to wreak destruction - than it is to picture a flesh-and-blood human being doing the damage."

In contrast, in a February 7, 2006 article for Ynetnews entitled "Anti-Semitism Now", Irit Linor criticized the movie as a "quality Nazi film".

Accolades

Academy Award
On January 31, 2006, the film was nominated in the Best Foreign Language Film category.

Golden GlobeParadise Now'' won "Best Foreign Language Film" for the 63rd Golden Globe Awards, the first time a Palestinian film was nominated for such an award.

Other awards won
 2005 Berlin International Film Festival: 
 Amnesty International Film Prize
 AGICOA 2005 Blue Angel Award
 Reader Jury of the "Berliner Morgenpost"
 2005 European Film Awards:
 Best Screenplay
 2005 Independent Spirit Awards:
 Best Foreign Film
 2005 National Board of Review Awards (USA) : 
Best Foreign Language Film 
 2005 Netherlands Film Festival: 
 Best Feature Film (Beste Lange Speelfilm)
 Best Editing (Beste Montage)
 2005 Durban International Film Festival (South Africa)
 Best Director
  2005 Dallas-Fort Worth Film Critics Association Awards
 Best Foreign Language Film
 2005 Vancouver Film Critics Circle Awards
 Best Foreign Film

See also

 List of Palestinian submissions for the Academy Award for Best Foreign Language Film

Notes

External links
 Official website
 
 
 

2005 drama films
2005 films
2000s Arabic-language films
Best Foreign Language Film Golden Globe winners
Films directed by Hany Abu-Assad
Films set in Israel
Independent Spirit Award for Best Foreign Film winners
Israeli–Palestinian conflict films
Palestinian drama films
Political drama films
Warner Independent Pictures films